The 1953-58 Mediterranean Cup was the third and last championship of the Mediterranean Cup, which is a football competition contested by men's national teams and national B teams of the states bordering the Mediterranean Sea. The tournament was played on the road and spanned six years, and it was played in a round-robin system in which the six teams involved played two matches against the other. Italy, France and Spain played with their B teams and the later became the champion of the organization in which Egypt, Turkey and Greece participated with their A teams.

The matches that were supposed to be played between the teams of Turkey and Greece were not played due to the tension between the two countries, and Turkey played the last three matches with the B team.

Results

Group

Top Scorers

References

External links 
Mediterranean Cup results

Sport in the Mediterranean